Zdeněk Hajný (30 January 1942, Vsetín – 1 March 2014, Prague) was a Czech painter, graphic artist and psychologist. In 1994, he founded Galerie Cesty ke světlu.

References

Other websites

  

1942 births
2014 deaths
Czech painters
Czech male painters
Czech graphic designers
Czech psychologists
People from Vsetín